The body of light, sometimes called the 'astral body' or the 'subtle body,' is a "quasi material" aspect of the human body, being neither solely physical nor solely spiritual, posited by a number of philosophers, and elaborated on according to various esoteric, occult, and mystical teachings. Other terms used for this body include body of glory, spirit-body, radiant body, luciform body, augoeides ('radiant'), astroeides ('starry or sidereal body'), and celestial body.

The concept derives from the philosophy of Plato: the word 'astral' means 'of the stars'; thus the astral plane  consists of the Seven Heavens of the classical planets.  The idea is rooted in common worldwide religious accounts of the afterlife in which the soul's journey or "ascent" is described in such terms as "an ecstatic, mystical or out-of body experience, wherein the spiritual traveller leaves the physical body and travels in their body of light into 'higher' realms."

Neoplatonists Porphyry and Proclus elaborated on Plato's description of the starry nature of the human psyche. Throughout the Renaissance, philosophers and alchemists, healers including Paracelsus and his students, and natural scientists such as John Dee, continued to discuss the nature of the astral world intermediate between earth and the divine. The concept of the astral body or body of light was adopted by 19th-century ceremonial magician Éliphas Lévi, Florence Farr and the magicians of the Hermetic Order of the Golden Dawn, including Aleister Crowley.

History
Plato and Aristotle taught that the stars were composed of a type of matter different from the four earthly elements - a fifth, ethereal element or quintessence. In the astral mysticism of the classical world the human psyche was composed of the same material, thus accounting for the influence of the stars upon human affairs. In his commentaries on Plato's Timaeus, Proclus wrote;

Such doctrines were commonplace in mystery-schools, Gnostic and Hermetic sects throughout the Roman Empire, and influenced the early Christian church. Paul's Second Epistle to the Corinthians contains a reference to the astral plane or astral projection: "I know a man in Christ who fourteen years ago was caught up to the third heaven. Whether it was in the body or out of the body I do not know—God knows."

Neoplatonism
Neoplatonism is a branch of classical philosophy that uses the works of Plato as a guide to understanding religion and the world. In the Myth of Er, particularly, Plato rendered an account of the afterlife which involved a journey through seven planetary spheres and then eventual reincarnation. He taught that man was composed of mortal body, immortal reason and an intermediate 'spirit'. Neoplatonists agreed as to the immortality of the rational soul but disagreed as to whether man's "irrational soul" was immortal and celestial ("starry", hence astral) or whether it remained on earth and dissolved after death. 

The early Neoplatonist Porphyry (3rd century) wrote of the Augoeides, a term which is encountered in the literature of Neoplatonic theurgy. The word originates from Ancient Greek and has been interpreted as deriving from '', meaning 'egg', or '', meaning 'dawn', combined with '', indicative of 'news' or 'a message', or with '', an 'idol' or 'reflection'. Thomas Taylor commented on Porphyry's use of the term:

Synesius, a 4th-century Greek bishop, according to Isaac Myer equated the divine body with 'Imagination' (phantasia) itself, considering it to be "something very subtle, yet material," referring to it as "the first body of the soul."

Building on concepts described by Iamblichus and Plotinus, the late Neoplatonist Proclus (5th century), who is credited as the first to speak of subtle planes, posited two  subtle bodies, vehicles, or 'carriers' (okhema), intermediate between spirit and the physical body. These were:
(cf. pneumatic).

Renaissance medicine and magic

Marsilio Ficino (1433–1499) translated the Corpus Hermetica into Latin. He wrote:

Ficino describes this tenuous form as being of aether or quintessence, the fifth element, spirit, and says that it has a "fiery and starry nature." He also refers to it as the 'astral body,' intermediate between spirit and the body of matter.

Such ideas greatly influenced the Renaissance medicine of Paracelsus (1493–1541) and Servetus (1509/11–1553). John Dee  (1527–1608/9), a student of Ficino, based his natural philosophy on Ficino and the Medieval optical theories of Roger Bacon, William of Ockham, John Peckham, and Vitello; according to Szulakowska "specifically for his ideas concerning the radiation of light rays and the effects of the planetary and stellar influences on the earth." Dee was also influenced by the Arabian philosopher Al-Kindi, whose treatise De radiis stellarum wove together astrology and optical theory, which inspired Dee's Propaedeumata Aphoristica. In Dee's system of Enochian magic, there were three main techniques: invocation (prayer), scrying (crystal-gazing), and traveling in the body of light.

Isaac Newton
 

Isaac Newton (1642–1726/27), despite his renown for his scientific pursuits, held an alchemist's perspective. In the early 18th century, he speculated that material bodies might be transformed into light, connecting this idea with the 'subtle body' of alchemy.

Franz Anton Mesmer
Franz Anton Mesmer (1734–1815) borrowed from Newton's more occult theories with the intention of finding medical applications. He also built on the work of Richard Mead (1673–1754), who hypothesized that due to the astral nature of the human body, it is subject to an "all‐pervading gravitation emanating from the stars." Mesmer expanded this concept, hypothesizing that bodies were subject to a form of magnetism emanating from all other bodies, not just the stars, which he called 'animal magnetism,' describing it as a "fluid which is universally widespread and pervasive in a manner which allows for no void, subtly permits no comparison, and is of a nature which is susceptible to receive, propagate, and communicate all impressions of movement." Mesmer's theories influenced the Spiritualist traditions.

Helena Blavatsky
Helena Blavatsky (1831–1891) wrote of the Augoeides, though her own theories of the 'astral body' were derived from the 'subtle body' traditions of Eastern mysticism.

Ceremonial magic

Éliphas Lévi
In the mid-nineteenth century the French occultist Éliphas Lévi (1810–1875) introduced the term 'astral light' in his Dogme et rituel de la haute magie (1856), and wrote of it as a factor he considered of key importance to magic, alongside the power of will and the doctrine of correspondences. Lévi developed a full theory of the 'sidereal body' which for the most part agrees with the Neoplatonic tradition of Proclus, Iamblichus, Plotinus, and Porphyry, though he credited Paracelsus as his source. He considered the astral light to be the medium of all light, energy, and movement, describing it in terms that recall both Mesmer and the luminiferous aether.

Lévi's idea of the astral was to have much influence in the English-speaking world due to being adopted by the Hermetic Order of the Golden Dawn and by Aleister Crowley, who believed himself to be Lévi's reincarnation and promoted a number of ideas from his works, including his idea of the true self or True Will, much of his system of ceremonial magic, and his theories of the astral plane and the body of light.

Florence Farr and the Golden Dawn

The Hermetic Order of the Golden Dawn, a secret magical order originating in 1888 in Victorian England, describes the subtle body as "the Sphere of Sensation." Florence Farr (1860–1917) developed the Golden Dawn education system, succeeded William Wynn Westcott as "Chief Adept in Anglia," and wrote several of the Order's secret instruction papers, called the "Flying Rolls." Her magical motto was Sapientia Sapienti Dona Data (Latin: 'Wisdom is a gift given to the wise'). 

Farr's writings, signed with the initials of her motto 'SSDD', studied the ten parts of a human being which she said were described in ancient Egyptian writings, including the Sahu, the elemental or astral body; the Tet or Zet, the spiritual body or soul; and the Khaibt, the sphere or aura, radiating from the Sahu, and symbolised by a fan. Farr wrote that the ancient Egyptian adepts "looked upon each body, or manifested being, as the material basis of a long vista of immaterial entities functioning as a spirit, soul and mind in the formative, creative and archetypal worlds." She described how the Khaibt forms a sphere around a human being at birth.

The occultist Israel Regardie (1907–1985) published a collection of Golden Dawn magical texts which state that "the whole sphere of sensation which surroundeth the whole physical body of a man is called 'the magical mirror of the universe'. For therein are represented all the occult forces of the universe projected as on a sphere..." Regardie connects the Sephiroth of the Qabalistic Tree of Life to this sphere as a microcosm of the universe. The Kabbalistic concept of the Nephesch ('psyche') is seen as "the subtle body of refined Astral Light upon which, as on an invisible pattern, the physical body is extended."

Aleister Crowley 
The occultist Aleister Crowley (1875–1947), the founder of the new religious movement Thelema, translated augoeides literally as 'egg message' and connected it with 'the Knowledge & Conversation of the Holy Guardian Angel' or 'higher & original (egg) genius' associated with each human being. He stressed that the body of light must be built up though the use of imagination, and that it must then be animated, exercised, and disciplined. According to Asprem (2017):

Crowley explains that the most important practices for developing the Body of Light are:

 The fortification of the Body of Light by the constant use of rituals, by the assumption of god-forms, and by the right use of the Eucharist.
 The purification and consecration and exaltation of that Body by the use of rituals of invocation.
 The education of that Body by experience. It must learn to travel on every plane; to break down every obstacle which may confront it. 

According to Crowley, the role of the body of light is broader than simply being a vehicle for astral travel — he writes that it is also the storehouse of all experience.

Other uses
The term 'body of light' is also used in Tibetan Buddhism, particularly in the Dzogchen and Mahamudra traditions. It is the usual translation of the Tibetan term, ′od lus, also known as the illusory body.

Meditation research
Western scientists have started to explore the subtle body concept in relation to research on meditation. The subtle body model can be cross-referenced onto modern maps of the central nervous system, and applied in research on meditation.

See also

Ægypt
Assumption of godforms
Astrotheology
Body in TCM
Body of resurrection
Jakob Böhme
Cake of Light
Celestial body
Great Work (Alchemy)
Great Work (Hermeticism)
Great Work (Thelema)
Luminous mind
Remote viewing
Saṃbhogakāya
Scrying
Spirit body
Third eye

Notes

References

Citations

Works cited

 

 
 
 

.

Further reading

 

 Walker, Benjamin, Beyond the Body: The Human Double, Routledge and Kegan Paul, London, 1974, ; Fitzhenry, Toronto, 1974; Arkana, 1988, .

External links

Ceremonial magic
Esoteric cosmology
Light and religion
Neoplatonism
Thelema
Western esotericism